Joe Kopp is an American motorcycle racer. He has competed in the AMA Pro Flat Track Racing Championship since 1993, winning the AMA Pro Grand National Championship in 2000.

AMA Pro Flat Track

Kopp is one of 15 riders to complete the Dirt Track "Grand Slam"—victories on short track, TT, half-mile, and mile courses.
In addition to his 2000 AMA Grand National Championship, he earned the 1999 and 2000 AMA 600 Hotshot and Supertracker Championships.

F-USA Dirt Track

Kopp raced Clear Channel's F-USA Dirt Track series in 2002 and 2003, winning the 2002 Plymouth, Wisconsin Short Track on a KTM.

AMA Pro Supermoto Championship

Kopp raced in the AMA Supermoto Championship in 2003 with the HMC KTM Team.  He qualified for a chance at the championship by being one of the 74 riders who qualified for the winner-take-all final.

Pikes Peak International Hill Climb

Kopp competed in the 2011 Pikes Peak International Hill Climb on a Team Latus Triumph Speed Triple. He was the second-fastest motorcycle racer up the mountain, and won the Exhibition Class with a time of 11:26.530.

AMA Vance & Hines XR1200 Championship

Koop raced in the AMA Vance & Hines XR1200 Championship in 2011, earning a third-place finish at the series opener in Daytona Beach, Florida.  The top four finishers in the race were separated by only two-tenths of one second.

Career highlights

2000- AMA Grand National Champion, Supertracker Champion, Hotshoe Champion    Corbin Harley-Davidson XR-750, KTM 505, Suzuki TL1000
2001- 3rd, AMA Grand National Championship   Corbin Harley-Davidson XR-750, KTM 505
2003- 3rd, AMA Grand National Championship    KTM Harley-Davidson XR-750, KTM 450
2004- 2nd, AMA Grand National Championship    KTM Harley-Davidson XR-750, KTM 450
2005- 3rd, AMA Grand National Championship    Latus H-D Harley-Davidson XR-750, Honda CRF450
2006- 3rd, AMA Grand National Championship    Latus H-D Harley-Davidson XR-750, Honda CRF450
2008- 2nd, AMA Grand National Championship    Latus H-D Harley-Davidson XR-750, Honda CRF450
2009- 2nd, AMA Grand National Championship   Latus H-D Harley-Davidson XR-750, Honda CRF450
2010- 2nd, AMA Grand National Championship    Latus H-D Harley-Davidson XR-750, Lloyd Bros. Ducati 1000, Honda CRF450
2016- Kopp is selected by Indian Motorcycle Company to be the first to race the all-new Indian Scout FTR750

References

External links
   "Smokin’" Joe Kopp Official Site

1969 births
Living people
American motorcycle racers
AMA Grand National Championship riders
Sportspeople from Spokane, Washington